Vysoká is a municipality and village in Bruntál District in the Moravian-Silesian Region of the Czech Republic. It has about 300 inhabitants.

Administrative parts
Villages of Bartultovice and Pitárné are administrative parts of Vysoká.

Geography
Vysoká is situated in the Osoblažsko microregion on the border with Poland. It lies in the Zlatohorská Highlands. The Osoblaha flows across the territory. The village of Pitárne is located at the confluence of the Osoblaha with the Mušlov Creek.

History

The first written mention of Vysoká is from 1267.

Sights
The landmarks of Vysoká are the Church of Saint Urban from 1767 and Church of the Virgin Mary in Pitárné from 1766.

References

External links

Villages in Bruntál District